The 1943–44 SK Rapid Wien season was the 46th season in club history.

Squad

Squad and statistics

Squad statistics

Fixtures and results

Gauliga

Tschammerpokal

References

1943-44 Rapid Wien Season
Rapid